The Social Democratic Harmony Party (abbr. KDM) is a regional political party based in Sabah, Malaysia founded by Peter Anthony and Juil Nuatim. It aims to represent the interests of the Kadazan-Dusun and Murut people. The KDM is currently aligned to the government as a partner, providing confidence and supply to the Gabungan Rakyat Sabah (GRS) state ruling coalition led by Chief Minister Hajiji Noor. The party picked the acryonym KDM, which is a common reference to the native Kadazandusun and Murut communities which the party represents.

History

Formed
KDM was founded as a political party on 28 January 2022 in Dewan Seri Antenom in the interior district of Tenom, Sabah. Its founding President Peter Anthony is a political strongman in Tenom and a Member of the Sabah State Legislative Assembly (MLA) for Melalap and was State Minister of Infrastructure Development of Sabah as well as Vice-President of the Heritage Party (WARISAN), an opposition party in Sabah. He left WARISAN exactly a month before the founding of KDM on 28 December 2021 along with Limbahau MLA Juil Nuatim. He claimed WARISAN "had diverted from its original path of serving Sabah" by spreading wings to Peninsular Malaysia on 18 December 2021 and denied that his decision to leave was due to his ongoing court case over a charge of falsifying the letter from the office of Universiti Malaysia Sabah deputy vice-chancellor for system maintenance contract work at the university in 2014. President of WARISAN Shafie Apdal disagreed and claimed that the reason was due to the court case and questioned the contradictory reasoning of Peter for aligning the party with GRS, a political coalition led by the Malaysian United Indigenous Party (BERSATU) which is a national party as well. After Peter and Juil left WARISAN, there were attempts by President of the Homeland Solidarity Party (STAR) Jeffrey Kitingan to invite them to the party and ask them to abandon the plans to form KDM for the sake of native unity. However, they rejected the attempts and went ahead with forming KDM.

Registered and legalised
On 21 February 2022, Peter, who returned from Kuala Lumpur to Sabah, revealed he had got KDM officially registered after being approved by the Registrar of Societies (RoS) three days before on 18 February 2022. He also added that he would be officially launching it in Kota Kinabalu, Sabah on 13 March 2022. He also reiterated that KDM would work with the ruling GRS state government and would apply to join the coalition when it also gets registered as a formal entity for the betterment of the state. He claimed that KDM would be focusing on the people of Sabah as members and its priority was to ensure issues of the needs of Sabah are the key focus by saying that "We want to focus on Sabah. If you look at Sarawak, the local parties are strong and united and able to serve the people better and resolve their problems". He also announced the leadership structure of KDM with him as party president. In addition, it ended speculation that there was pressure disallowing the registration of KDM that would split the native community. On 26 February 2022, Chief Minister of Sabah and GRS Chairman Hajiji Noor added that he personally supported the plan of KDM to join or support GRS but stressed that all the GRS component parties must agree on this before officially accepting KDM and his attention remained on more pressing issues like the economy, development and well-being of the people of Sabah. On 8 March 2022, it was revealed that Hajiji would instead launch KDM after his consent to it. Juil revealed that the party had invited 1,200 guests including top leaders from various political parties of Sabah especially the party presidents of GRS component parties to attend the launching ceremony with the compliance of COVID-19 pandemic standard operating procedures (SOPs). On 13 March 2022, the party was officially launched by Hajiji who "welcomed the intention" of the party to join GRS coalition after Peter reiterated the wish but he also reiterated that a decision on it would only be made after bringing the proposal into discussions among GRS component parties. Hajiji also declared GRS a single political entity during the ceremony after receiving certificate of approval from RoS two days before on 11 March 2022 to register and legalise it. The ceremony was also attended by the representatives from various political parties of GRS component parties like Sabah Progressive Party (SAPP), Parti Bersatu Rakyat Sabah (PBRS), Homeland Solidarity Party (STAR) and United Sabah Party (PBS). Peter added that it was up to GRS to decide whether the party would be accepted into the coalition as a new component party. He also added that Sabah leaders should stop fighting each other and unite to push for more developments and fight for state rights so that they were able to have stronger voice for the sake of Sabah and her people. On KDM, Peter also said the party would pay attention to holding road shows to register new voters and prepare for the next Malaysian general election. Furthermore, he also stated that the party would serve all, regardless of race and religion and fight for state rights under the Malaysia Agreement 1963 (MA63). However on 14 March 2022, PBS denied sending any representatives to the ceremony  as all PBS divisions were busy with preparations for the annual general assembly (AGM) through a statement. The statement also came after PBS cautioned other GRS component parties to consider comprehensively and not to rush to accept any new partners into the coalition.

List of leaders

List of Presidents

Leadership structure 

 President:
 Peter Anthony
 Deputy Presidents:
 Juil Nuatim 
 Wetrom Bahanda 
 Vice-Presidents:
 Johair Matlani
 Laimon Laiki
 Martin Tommy
 Henry Saimpon
 Ronnie Loh
 Women's Wing Chief:
 Anna Maria Bernadus
 Youth Wing Chief:
 Jumardie Lukman
 Secretary-General:
 Gaim James Lunkapis
 Treasurer-General:
 David Lo Ho Ping
 Information Chief:
 Aisat Ellik Iggau
|}

Elected representatives

Dewan Rakyat (House of Representatives) 

Social Democratic Harmony Party has 2 MPs in the House of Representatives.

Dewan Undangan Negeri (State Legislative Assembly)

Malaysian State Assembly Representatives 

Sabah State Legislative Assembly

General election results

References 

Political parties in Sabah
Political parties established in 2022
2022 establishments in Malaysia